Patty Stair (November 12, 1869 – April 26, 1926) was an American organist and composer.

Biography
Patty Stair was born in Cleveland, Ohio, the niece of tenor Edwin Stair. She studied with music teachers including Franklin Bassett and at Hathaway Brown school for girls. She taught organ at the Cleveland Conservatory of Music from about 1889 to 1921 and served as organist for several churches in the Cleveland area.

She was the first woman member and served as dean of the Ohio Chapter of the American Guild of Organists, and directed the chorus of the Forthnightly Musical Club. She also served as president of the Women's Music Teachers association of Cleveland. Stair never married, and died of pneumonia in Cleveland.

Works
Stair composed for orchestra, songs and sacred anthems, and produced two light operas.  Selected works include:

Intermezzo for orchestra
Six songs ("If I could take your tears, love," "Madrigal," "Love song," "When daisies bloom," Daphne’s cheeks," "Slumber song")
All my Heart this Night rejoices, Christmas anthem
Art thou weary, Sacred Duet for Soprano and Tenor, words by J.M. Neale
Berceuse for violin and P.F., 1908
Calm on the listening Ear of Night, Christmas Anthem, words by E.H. Sears
Christ beneath Thy Cross, Anthem, 1915
Christmas Cradle Song, For mixed voices and Organ, with Violin ad libitum, words by M. Luther
Come, ye Faithful, Hymn-Anthem for Easter by Patty Stair, 1908
Evening Hymn, Softly now the Light of Day, Anthem for mixed voices, 1907
A Folk-Tale, for violin and P.F., 1908
Hark, what mean those holy Voices ... Anthem for mixed Quartet, 1902
I have longed for Thy Salvation, anthem, 1913
It is a good Thing to give Thanks ... anthem, 1913
 Little Dutch Lullaby, chorus for women's voices, 1905

References

External links
 Sheet Music for "Little Dutch Lullaby", G. Schirmer, Inc., 1905.
 So sweet is she (1916), by Patty Stair (1868--1926) from YouTube
 

1869 births
1926 deaths
19th-century classical composers
20th-century classical composers
American music educators
American women classical composers
American classical composers
Musicians from Cleveland
American classical organists
19th-century American composers
Women organists
20th-century American women musicians
20th-century American composers
Educators from Ohio
American women educators
Classical musicians from Ohio
Women music educators
20th-century women composers
19th-century women composers
Deaths from pneumonia in Ohio
19th-century American women musicians